Bob's Lake is a lake in geographic Patterson Township in the Unorganized Centre Part of Parry Sound District in Central Ontario, Canada. It is in the Great Lakes Basin, and the nearest community is Restoule,  to the east. It is located in the Almaguin Highlands.

Hydrology
The primary outflow, at the north, is an unnamed creek to Kidd Lake. It flows via Rainy Creek, the Memesagamesing River, and the French River to Georgian Bay on Lake Huron.

See also
List of lakes in Ontario

References

Lakes of Parry Sound District